The Weigel House, also known as the Monday House, is located at 2721 Asbury Road in Knoxville, Tennessee. It is listed on the National Register of Historic Places as "Monday House".  The house was constructed in the late 19th century in the Queen Anne style. It was one of the better-known homes of the Weigel family, who immigrated from Germany in the 19th century and were prominent in the dairy business, both in East and North Knox County, for generations.

In September 2017, Manjit and Colleen (Cruze) Bhatti purchased the Weigel House. September 2017 Cruze Farm closed down their summer ice cream popup on Gay Street and moved their ice cream churns to the Weigel House. On October 5, 2017, Cruze Farm opened their first permanent ice cream shop in the Weigel House. Although some customers refer to this location as "the farm," the family dairy farm is located further east in Riverdale and is not open to the public. The Cruze family lived in Asbury prior to 1973. Asbury is the community where the Burkharts and Cruzes met, married, and dairy-ed until 1973 when Knox County purchased many of the dairy farms located in the Forks of the River for the industrial park. Grandpa Glenn Cruze relocated to Riverdale and continued dairy farming. His son, Earl Cruze and wife, Cheri, bought land in Asbury, built a processing plant and began bottling milk in 1980. 40 years later, Earl's daughter Colleen and husband, Manjit, are back in the Asbury community, with fresh churned ice cream and delicious pizza.

The house was previously used as a residence by Steven and Karla Shell.  Their children, Brandon, Summer, and Damon Morell lived with them from 1998 until 2001.  The house was placed on the historical registry by Steven and Karla under the name Weigel/Shell Estate.  Prior to their sale of the estate, it comprised the house, a large barn, a garden patio, a detached 2 car garage, and 3 outbuildings.  During their ownership of this house, Steven and Karla completed a restoration of the home in which they remodeled the kitchen and main bathroom with the help of Jerome and Gina Sasser.  This restoration reversed the remodeling project that had been undertaken by the previous owners sometime during the 1970s.  In that project, the previous owners had laid carpet over the original hardwood floors and installed a drop ceiling in the kitchen, where they had also replaced all cabinetry.

References

Houses on the National Register of Historic Places in Tennessee
Houses in Knoxville, Tennessee
National Register of Historic Places in Knoxville, Tennessee